Thailand has competed at every celebration of the Asian Para Games, Thai athletes have won a total of 41 gold medals (5th out of 42) and 200 overall medals (4th out of 42) at the Asian Para Games.

Asian Para Games

Medals by Games

Medals by sport

Asian Youth Para Games

Medals by Games

Medals by Sport

ASEAN Para Games

Medals by Games

See also

 Olympics
 Thailand at the Olympics
 Thailand at the Youth Olympics
 Paralympic
 Thailand at the Paralympics
 Asian Games
 Thailand at the Asian Games

 Other
 Thailand at the Universiade
 Thailand at the World Games

References

 
Asian Para Games
Nations at the Asian Para Games